Sulfamerazine is a sulfonamide antibacterial.

Synthesis

See also
Sulfadiazine
Sulfamethazine
Sulfamethizole

References

External links

 Sulfamerazine (DrugBank)
 Sulfamerazine (NIST)

Sulfonamide antibiotics
Pyrimidines